Jacob Tandrup Holm (born 5 September 1995) is a Danish handball player who plays for Füchse Berlin and the Danish national team.

He represented Denmark at the 2020 European Men's Handball Championship.

References

External links

Danish male handball players
1995 births
Living people
Expatriate handball players
People from Esbjerg
Danish expatriate sportspeople in Germany
Füchse Berlin Reinickendorf HBC players
Handball-Bundesliga players
Handball players at the 2020 Summer Olympics
Medalists at the 2020 Summer Olympics
Olympic silver medalists for Denmark
Olympic medalists in handball
Sportspeople from the Region of Southern Denmark